was a Japanese monthly photographic magazine, published from April 1926 until July 2020, when it was discontinued due to declining circulation.

History and profile
The first issue was that for April 1926. It was from the outset published by Asahi Shimbun-sha, publisher of the newspaper The Asahi Shimbun. The headquarters was in Tokyo.

From the January 1941 issue, it merged with the magazines Geijutsu Shashin Kenkyū ("Technique Photograph Studies") and Shōzō Shashin Kenkyū ("Portrait Photograph Studies"). Publication was suspended with the April 1942 issue.

Publication resumed after the Second World War with the October 1949 issue. Its cover employed a monochrome portrait of a girl by Ihei Kimura, who would become a major contributor.

Asahi Camera attempted to satisfy interests in all areas of photography, with short portfolios in monochrome and color by established and new photographers (most but not all of them Japanese), contests for readers, articles about technique, and (accounting for much of the magazine's bulk) news and tests of equipment. The April 2006 issue, for example, had over four hundred pages (many of them advertising, but the great majority editorial) with five or more pages devoted to work by each of ten photographers, the announcement of the latest Kimura Ihei Award, articles about equipment (new, old and even future), contests, and much else.

Even if one considers only its uninterrupted years of publication, from 1949, Asahi Camera was the oldest surviving Japanese photography magazine. Like any magazine that attempts to satisfy people with very different interests, it was sometimes criticized for not serving any of them particularly well, but its equipment reviews appeared to be as rigorous as any and it continued to attract some of the best photographers for its portfolios. Like many photographic magazines, many of its covers somehow happened to show conventionally attractive young women (sometimes nude), and the overall impression it gave was unadventurous, but daring was a rare commodity in the Japanese magazine market and Asahi Camera did display work that cannot be regarded as at all commercial.

Since the demise of Camera Mainichi in 1985, the only rival as a magazine attempting to cater for all photographic interests became Nippon Camera.

From its 1926 start until around 1932, in addition to the katakana title, the magazine was prominently titled in English, Asahi Camera: The Japanese Journal of Photography. A shortened version, Asahi Camera, continued as an alternative title until late in the twentieth century but then was written "ASAHICAMERA".

Notes

External links
 Publisher's site
Dealer's description

1926 establishments in Japan
1942 disestablishments in Japan
1949 establishments in Japan
2020 disestablishments in Japan
Asahi Shimbun Company
Defunct magazines published in Japan
Magazines established in 1926
Magazines disestablished in 1942
Magazines established in 1949
Magazines disestablished in 2020
1941 mergers and acquisitions
Magazines published in Tokyo
Monthly magazines published in Japan
Photography magazines published in Japan